The Windshear Full Scale Rolling Road Wind Tunnel is an automotive wind tunnel in Concord, North Carolina. 

In January 2008 Wind Shear, a division of US machine tool builder Haas Automation, completed construction on one of the most advanced automotive wind tunnels in the world. The full-scale tunnel is located adjacent to Concord Regional Airport in Concord, North Carolina. The commercial operation was designed for vehicles from race industries: stock car, Formula One, Indy car, drag racing, as well as production car industries.

Wind Shear's tunnel is a closed air circuit, temperature-controlled system built around a rolling road. The rolling road, akin to a giant treadmill, is 10 ft wide by 29.5 ft long (3 m x 9 m) and accommodates full-size cars. Air temperature, critical to repeatable data collection, is maintained at a constant , plus or minus one degree.

In wind tunnel testing, the size of the test chamber can greatly affect the quality of the test. An example of this, the blockage effect, is the condition where air flow in the wind tunnel is partially blocked by the vehicle. The blockage becomes more critical as the cross section of the test vehicle increases relative to the size of nozzle and airstream. As the vehicle increases in size relative to the nozzle, test data become less reliable as increased blockage effects the quality of the actual windstream. Windshear's solution was to build a sufficiently large air circuit. Nozzle size is a relatively large 180 square feet (16.7 square meters).

See also
Wind shear

References

Bibliography

External links 

Test SLATE - Automated Test Software by JACOBS Used in the Operation of the Windshear Tunnel

Wind tunnels
Buildings and structures in Cabarrus County, North Carolina